The insular single leaf bat or Lesser Antillean long-tongued bat (Monophyllus plethodon) is a species of bat in the family Phyllostomidae.  It is found on the Lesser Antilles, on Anguilla, Antigua and Barbuda, Barbados, Dominica, Guadeloupe, Martinique, Montserrat, Saint Lucia, and Saint Vincent and the Grenadines.

Subspecies
The Puerto Rican long-nosed bat (M. p. prater) is an extinct subspecies of the insular single leaf bat from Puerto Rico.

References

Monophyllus
Mammals described in 1900
Mammals of Anguilla
Taxonomy articles created by Polbot